ORG-20599 is a synthetic neuroactive steroid, with sedative effects resulting from its action as a GABAA receptor positive allosteric modulator and, at higher concentrations, agonist. It was developed for use as an anaesthetic agent but was never marketed for this purpose, although it is still used in scientific research.

Chemistry

References

5β-Pregnanes
Neurosteroids
Anticonvulsants
Hypnotics
4-Morpholinyl compunds
Organochlorides
Secondary alcohols
Ketones
GABAA receptor agonists
GABAA receptor positive allosteric modulators
Glycine receptor agonists